Deshun is a given name. Notable people with the name include:

Deshun Deysel (born 1970), South African mountaineer and businesswoman
Deshun Jackson, American streetball player
Xiu Deshun (born 1989), Chinese chess grandmaster

See also
DeSean

Masculine given names